Persol is an Italian brand of luxury eyewear. 

Persol may also refer to:

 Persol Holdings, a Japanese human resource management company
 Stéphane Persol, a French footballer